East Tampa is a district within the city limits of Tampa, Florida. As of the 2010 census the neighborhood had a population of 16,355. The ZIP Codes serving the neighborhood are 33605 and 33610. The district is about four miles northeast of Downtown Tampa.

Geography
East Tampa boundaries are roughly Hillsborough Avenue to the north, 15th Street to the west, Interstate 4 to the south, and 40th Street to the east.

History
The area has been the location of several riots.

Demographics
Source: Hillsborough County Atlas

As of the census of 2010, there were 16,355 people and 5,565 households residing in the neighborhood. The population density was 4,447/mi2. The racial makeup of the neighborhood was 10% White, 84% Black or African American, less than 1% Native American, less than 1% Asian, less than 2% from other races, and 2% from two or more races. Hispanic or Latino of any race were 11% of the population.

There were 5,565 households, out of which 31% had children under the age of 18 living with them, 22% were married couples living together, 18% had a female householder with no husband present, and 17% were non-families. 27% of all households were made up of individuals.

In the neighborhood the population was spread out, with 31% under the age of 18, 22% from 18 to 34, 18% from 35 to 49, 17% from 50 to 64, and 13% who were 65 years of age or older. For every 100 females, there were 87.4 males.

The per capita income for the neighborhood was $11,133. About 33% of the population were below the poverty line, including 47.0% of those under age 18 and 9.0% of those age 65 or over.

Areas within East Tampa
East Tampa consists of three distinct areas:
Belmont Heights
College Hill
Jackson Heights

Education
East Tampa is served by Hillsborough County Public Schools, which serves Hillsborough County. Schools which are located within the neighborhood are as follows:

Elementary
Edison
Lockhart
Lomax
Potter

Middle
Andrew J. Ferrell Middle Magnet School
Benjamin Franklin Middle Magnet School
Orange Grove Middle Magnet School
Nathan B. Young Middle Magnet School

High
Middleton High School

See also
Neighborhoods in Tampa, Florida

References

External links
East Tampa Business and Civic Association, Inc
East Tampa starter from the St. Petersburg Times

Neighborhoods in Tampa, Florida
Former municipalities in Florida